Big Rock Ridge is a ridge near Novato, California, and the 2nd tallest point in Marin County. The ridge is 5 miles long, and runs from the northwest to the east, dividing Novato's Ignacio Valley and San Rafael's Lucas Valley, and separating Novato from central and southern Marin County. Big Rock Ridge is named after the rock at the base of Big Rock Trail.

Geography 
Big Rock Ridge is the second-highest point in the Marin Hills, which in turn are a part of the California Coast Ranges. Much of eastern Big Rock Ridge is public land, with the Lucas Valley and Ignacio Open Space Preserves covering much of the foothills. Much of the eastern side also falls within city limits, with the northeastern side being in Novato and the southeastern side falling within Lucas Valley-Marinwood.

Various trails run up the ridge, but they all converge at the Big Rock Ridge Fire Road, which runs along the top of the ridge to access the 2 radio towers at the top. The easiest way to the top is the 6.7 mile Big Rock Trail, which opened in 2003 when George Lucas donated 800 acres of land to create the Lucas Valley Open Space Preserve. The views from Big Rock Ridge are sweeping, with views to Mt. St Helena and Mt. Diablo from the top.

Novato, California